The 84th Pennsylvania House of Representatives District is located in Northeastern Pennsylvania and has been represented by Joseph Hamm since 2021.

District profile
The 84th district encompasses part Lycoming County and all of Sullivan County and includes the following areas: 

Lycoming County

 Anthony Township
 Bastress Township
 Brown Township
 Cascade Township
 Cogan House Township
 Cummings Township
 Eldred Township
 Fairfield Township
 Franklin Township
 Gamble Township
 Hepburn Township
 Hughesville
 Jackson Township
 Jersey Shore
 Jordan Township
 Lewis Township
 Limestone Township
 McHenry Township
 McIntyre Township
 McNett Township
 Mifflin Township
 Mill Creek Township
Montoursville
 Moreland Township
 Muncy
 Muncy Township
 Muncy Creek Township
 Nippenose Township
Old Lycoming Township
 Penn Township
 Piatt Township
 Picture Rocks
 Pine Township
 Plunketts Creek Township
 Porter Township
 Salladasburg
 Shrewsbury Township
 Upper Fairfield Township
 Watson Township
 Wolf Township
Woodward Township

Sullivan County

Representatives

References

Government of Lycoming County, Pennsylvania
Government of Union County, Pennsylvania
84